Linstow or von Linstow may refer to:
 Linstow AS, one of the largest companies of Norway
 Dobbin-Linstow, a municipality in the Rostock district, in Mecklenburg-Vorpommern, Germany
 Hans Linstow (1787–1851), a Danish-born, Norwegian architect
 Hans Otfried von Linstow (1899–1944), a German Colonel who took part in the 20 July Plot to assassinate Adolf Hitler
 Otto Friedrich Bernhard von Linstow (1842–1916), a German high-ranking medical officer and helminthologist